The  Ministry of Foreign Affairs is the central government institution charged with leading the foreign affairs of Vietnam. The current Foreign Minister is Bùi Thanh Sơn.

Organisation

Ministerial units
 Department of ASEAN Affairs
 Department of Southeast Asian - South Asian - South Pacific Affairs
 Department of Northeast Asian Affairs
 Department of European Affairs
 Department of American Affairs
 Department of West Asian - Africa Affairs
 Department of Policy Planning
 Department of International Organisations
 Department of Law and International Treaty
 Department of Multilateral Economic Cooperation
 Department of General Economic Affairs
 Department of External Culture and UNESCO
 Department of Press and Information
 Department of Organisation and Personnel
 Office of the Ministry
 Ministry Inspectorate
 Bureau of Information Security
 Bureau of Consular Affairs
 Bureau of State Protocol
 Bureau of Administration and Finance
 Bureau of Diplomatic Corps Services
 Committee of Overseas Vietnamese
 Committee of National Border
 Intelligence and Analysis Service

Administrative units
 Ho Chi Minh City Department of Foreign Affairs
 Diplomatic Academy of Vietnam
 Foreign Press Centre
 National Translation and Interpretation Centre
 Information Centre
 Vietnam and the World Newspaper
 Permanent Missions of Vietnam to United Nations and International Organisations
 Vietnamese Embassies
 Vietnamese Consulate-Generals and Consulates

List of ministers

References

External links
 Official website 

Foreign affairs
Vietnam
1945 establishments in Vietnam